The Roman Catholic Archdiocese of Popayán is an archdiocese located in the city of Popayán in Colombia.

History
22 August 1546: Established as Diocese of Popayán from the Diocese of Panamá
20 June 1900: Promoted as Metropolitan Archdiocese of Popayán

Ordinaries

Bishops of Popayán 
Juan Valle (27 August 1547 – 1563)
Agustín Gormaz Velasco, OSA (1 March 1564 – 1590)
Domingo de Ulloa, OP (9 December 1591 – 3 April 1598), appointed Bishop of Michoacán, México
Juan de La Roca (5 July 1599 – 7 September 1605)
Juan Pedro González de Mendoza, OSA (17 November 1608 – 14 February 1618)
Ambrosio Vallejo Mejia, O. Carm. (2 December 1619 – 27 January 1631), appointed Bishop of Trujillo, Peru	
Feliciano de la Vega Padilla (10 February 1631 – 5 September 1633), appointed Bishop of La Paz, Bolivia
Diego Montoya Mendoza (5 September 1633 – 5 October 1637, appointed Bishop of Trujillo, Peru
Francisco de la Serna, OSA (25 August 1637 – 21 August 1645), appointed Bishop of La Paz, Bolivia
Vasco Jacinto de Contreras y Valverde (25 February 1658 – 7 June 1666), appointed Bishop of Ayacucho o Huamanga (Guamanga), Peru
Melchor Liñán y Cisneros (16 January 1668 – 8 February 1672), appointed Archbishop of La Plata o Charcas, Bolivia
Cristóbal Bernardo de Quirós (16 May 1672 – 11 May 1684)
Pedro Díaz de Cienfuegos (12 August 1686 – 20 February 1696), appointed Bishop of Trujillo, Peru
Mateo Panduro y Villafaña, OCD (18 June 1696 – 1 October 1714), appointed Bishop of La Paz, Bolivia
Juan Gómez de Neva y Frías (19 November 1714 – 19 November 1725), appointed Bishop of Quito, Ecuador
Juan Francisco Gómez Calleja (19 November 1725 – 9 September 1728)
Manuel Antonio Gómez de Silva (20 September 1728 – 29 September 1731)
Diego Fermín de Vergara, OSA (19 December 1732 – 12 December 1740), appointed Archbishop of Santafé en Nueva Granada
Francisco José de Figueredo y Victoria (30 January 1741 – 24 January 1752), appointed Archbishop of Guatemala
Diego del Corro (24 January 1752 – 13 March 1758), appointed Archbishop of Lima, Peru
Jerónimo de Obregón y Mena (13 March 1758 – 14 July 1785)
Angel Velarde y Bustamante (15 September 1788 – 6 July 1809)
Salvador Jiménez y Padilla (8 March 1816 – 13 February 1841)
Fernando Cuero y Caicedo, OFM (23 May 1842 – 7 August 1851)
Pedro Antonio Torres (20 December 1853 – 18 December 1866)
Carlos Bermúdez (13 March 1868 – 6 December 1887)
Juan Buenaventura Ortiz (1 June 1888 – 15 August 1894)
Manuel José Caicedo Martínez (2 December 1895 – 20 June 1900)

Archbishops of Popayán 
 Manuel José Caicedo Martínez (20 June 1900 – 14 December 1905), appointed Archbishop of Medellín
 Manuel Antonio Arboleda y Scarpetta, CM (18 April 1907 – 31 March 1923)
 Maximiliano Crespo Rivera (15 November 1923 – 7 November 1940)
 Juan Manuel González Arbeláez (20 June 1942 – 1 February 1944)
 Diego María Gómez Tamayo (22 April 1944 – 12 September 1964)
 Miguel Angel Arce Vivas (7 April 1965 – 11 October 1976)
 Samuel Silverio Buitrago Trujillo, CM (11 October 1976 – 11 April 1990)
 Alberto Giraldo Jaramillo, PSS (18 December 1990 – 13 February 1997), appointed Archbishop of Medellín
 Iván Antonio Marín López (19 April 1997 – 19 May 2018)
 Luis José Rueda Aparicio (19 May 2018 – 25 April 2020), appointed Archbishop of Bogotá
 Omar Alberto Sánchez Cubillos, O.P. (12 October 2020 – present)

Other affiliated bishops

Auxiliary bishops
Antonio Burbano, O.E.S.A. (1837)
Mateo José González Rubio (1839-1845)
José Elías Puyana (1849-1859), appointed Bishop of Pasto
Raúl Zambrano Camader (1956-1962), appointed Bishop of Facatativá
Alfonso Arteaga Yepes (1962-1965), appointed Bishop of Ipiales
Hernando Velásquez Lotero (1971-1973), appointed Bishop of Facatativá 
Alberto Giraldo Jaramillo, P.S.S. (1974-1977), appointed Bishop of Chiquinquirá (later returned here as Archbishop)

Other priest of this diocese who became bishop
Heladio Posidio Perlaza Ramírez, appointed Bishop of Cali in 1911

Suffragan dioceses
 Ipiales 
 Pasto
 Tumaco

See also
Roman Catholicism in Colombia

References

External links
 GCatholic.org

Roman Catholic dioceses in Colombia
Roman Catholic Ecclesiastical Province of Popayán
Religious organizations established in the 1540s
Roman Catholic dioceses established in the 16th century
Popayán